Pinnau is an Amt ("collective municipality") in the district of Pinneberg, in Schleswig-Holstein, Germany. The Amt Pinnau was formed in January 2007 by the merger of the Ämter Bönningstedt and Pinneberg-Land. The seat of the Amt is in Rellingen, itself not part of the Amt.

The Amt Pinnau consists of the following municipalities:

Borstel-Hohenraden 
Ellerbek 
Kummerfeld 
Prisdorf 
Tangstedt

References

Ämter in Schleswig-Holstein